Taverner may refer to:

 someone who owns a tavern
Taverner (surname)
 Taverner (opera), a 1972 opera by Peter Maxwell Davies

See also
 Tavernier (disambiguation)